Rumeal James Robinson (born November 13, 1966) is a Jamaican-American former professional basketball player. Growing up in Cambridge, Massachusetts, Robinson graduated from Cambridge Rindge and Latin School and went on to play point guard for the University of Michigan.  After a strong showing in Michigan's 1989 NCAA championship, Robinson was drafted #10 in the first round of the 1990 NBA draft.

Early life
Robinson was born in Mandeville, Jamaica, in the west-central portion of the island. His mother moved to the Boston area while he was a toddler, leaving him in his grandparents' care. Shortly after he turned 10 years old, his grandparents sent him to the United States in hopes of reuniting him with his mother. However, his mother made it clear that she didn't want him, and he was reduced to sleeping in apartment halls and Harvard College dorm stairways.

Early in the 1977-78 school year, he was taken in by Helen and Lou Ford, a respected local couple. They adopted him in 1978.  He blossomed into a star guard at Cambridge Rindge and Latin School, leading them to a state championship in 1986.

College
Robinson averaged 14.3 points and 5.7 assists during his collegiate career at the University of Michigan. He achieved fame during his junior year for sinking two crucial free throws with 3 seconds left in the 1989 NCAA Men's Division I Basketball Championship to win the game for the Wolverines over Seton Hall University. His mother persuaded the city of Cambridge to name her street "Rumeal Robinson Way" in his honor.

NBA career
Robinson was drafted in 1990 by the Atlanta Hawks with the 10th pick. He was signed to a four-year deal with the Hawks. He also played for the New Jersey Nets, Charlotte Hornets, Portland Trail Blazers, Phoenix Suns and Los Angeles Lakers. Robinson also spent time in the Continental Basketball Association. He played in the Euroleague during the 2001–02 season for KK Zadar.

In the NBA, Robinson's play was very inconsistent. His last season as a regular player was 1992-93, his first year in New Jersey; after that year, he never played in more than 54 games a season.

He was one of three Robinsons that the Portland Trail Blazers had in their line-up for the 1995–96 NBA season.  The others were Clifford Robinson and James Robinson (both no relation).

Robinson made some $5 million in the NBA, but spent it on a lavish lifestyle. He went through money so irresponsibly, he neglected to pay his bills. He was forced into bankruptcy in 1998.

Post-playing career, criminal activity and conviction

After his playing career was over, Robinson moved to Miami and attempted to become a property developer in his native Jamaica. He planned to build a 25,000 acre resort in his hometown called Harmony Cove. As part of his bid to attract investors, he persuaded his adoptive mother to take out a second mortgage on her house and lend it to Robinson as seed money. He promised to cover all the payments, and promised to give her $500,000 once the project was finished.

However, his high living in the 1990s had all but destroyed his credit, and he was unable to find a bank willing to lend him any money. Through a friend, he was referred to Community State Bank in Ankeny, Iowa. The bank's senior loan officer, Brian Williams, approved a $377,000 bridge loan to Robinson's company, Megaladon Development—ostensibly to help with advertising and business plans. Robinson paid $100,000 of the loan back to Williams as a bribe to move the approval process forward.

Over the next year and a half, Robinson received $1.2 million in loans from Community State Bank, all approved by Williams. However, he never paid the bank a single penny, and barely five percent of the money went toward developing Harmony Cove. The rest of it was used to buy expensive clothes, meals, motorcycles, jewelry, and other items.

The fraud was uncovered when Williams tried to hide the bad loans by rolling the interest and penalties into the principal for a new loan. One of Williams' subordinates was alarmed enough to alert bank officials. Community State Bank fired Williams and sued Megaladon for nonpayment. In August 2006, Community State Bank won $535,000 in damages. During the proceedings, it emerged that Robinson hadn't paid taxes since his playing days. During depositions to ascertain his net worth, Robinson admitted he had no net worth, and lived on roughly $20 at a time. His only possessions were a change of pants.

On August 24, 2009, a federal grand jury in Des Moines indicted Robinson, his girlfriend Stephanie Hodge, and Williams for bank fraud, conspiracy to commit bank fraud, bank bribery, wire fraud and making false statements to a financial institution. Robinson surrendered to authorities on September 4.

Soon after the arrest, his adoptive mother Helen Ford came forward and accused Robinson of swindling her out of her home. Unknown to Ford, Robinson had arranged to sell Ford's house to one of his business partners, Miami foreclosure specialist Rick Preston, for $250,000. Preston later sold the house to another business partner, Jorge Rodriguez, for $600,000. In turn, Rodriguez sold it to Stephen Hodge, the brother of Robinson's girlfriend at the time, for $1 million. The money was ostensibly intended to help build Harmony Cove, but was wasted on lavish spending and paying other debts. While Robinson initially tried to keep up the payments, the mortgage went unserviced for so long that a bank foreclosed on her house in 2007. In 2009, Ford was forced to move out of her home. By this time, Robinson had lost possession of his expensive condo in Aventura, and was living in a squalid, budget motel in North Miami Beach. Ford eventually got her home back in 2013.

On September 8, 2010, Robinson was convicted on 11 counts of bank bribery, wire fraud, conspiracy to commit bank fraud and making false statements to a financial institution. On January 7, 2011, federal judge Ronald E. Longstaff sentenced Robinson to 6 years (78 months) in prison. He was also ordered to pay $1,184,615 in restitution to Community State Bank and St. Paul Mercury Insurance. Robinson appealed his sentence in September 2011, claiming judge Longstaff had denied him a chance to change lawyers and had improperly taken his allocution statement into account at sentencing. A panel of the Eighth Circuit Court of Appeals upheld the sentence in December.

In March, 2012, a federal judge ruled that US$369,000 of Robinson's pension fund could be seized to help cover restitution owed due to his sham business deal.

Robinson served his sentence at various federal prisons in South Carolina, Louisiana and Florida. He was released on September 19, 2016 on five years' supervised release.

References

External links
NBA Player file 888
Rumeal Robinson @ basketball-reference.com
Rumeal Robinson @ basketballreference.com
University of Michigan Basketball Statistical Archive

1966 births
Living people
21st-century American businesspeople
ABA League players
African-American basketball players
All-American college men's basketball players
American adoptees
American confidence tricksters
American expatriate basketball people in Croatia
American expatriate basketball people in Italy
American expatriate basketball people in Venezuela
American men's basketball players
American people convicted of fraud
Atlanta Hawks draft picks
Atlanta Hawks players
Basketball players at the 1995 Pan American Games
Basketball players from Massachusetts
Cambridge Rindge and Latin School alumni
Charlotte Hornets players
Connecticut Pride players
Fortitudo Pallacanestro Bologna players
Grand Rapids Hoops players
Jamaican emigrants to the United States
KK Zadar players
La Crosse Bobcats players
Los Angeles Lakers players
Marinos B.B.C. players
McDonald's High School All-Americans
Medalists at the 1995 Pan American Games
Michigan Wolverines men's basketball players
New Jersey Nets players
Pan American Games medalists in basketball
Pan American Games silver medalists for the United States
Parade High School All-Americans (boys' basketball)
People convicted of making false statements
People from Mandeville, Jamaica
Phoenix Suns players
Point guards
Portland Trail Blazers players
Rapid City Thrillers players
Shreveport Crawdads players
Shreveport Storm players
Sportspeople from Cambridge, Massachusetts
21st-century African-American people
20th-century African-American sportspeople